Mark Rosenzweig may refer to:

 Mark Rosenzweig (economist), development economist at Yale University
 Mark Rosenzweig (psychologist) (1922–2009), American psychologist and pioneer of research on animal neuroplasticity